Luca Pellegrini (born 7 March 1999) is an Italian professional footballer who plays as a left back for  club Lazio, on loan from Juventus, and the Italy national team.

Club career

Roma
On 17 April 2018, Pellegrini signed his first professional contract with A.S. Roma keeping him at the club until 2021.

Pellegrini joined the first team in the 2018–19 season, aged 19. He made his professional and Serie A debut in a 4–0 win over Frosinone on 26 September 2018, making the assist for Aleksandar Kolarov's goal. He made his UEFA Champions League debut on 2 October 2018, in the group stage match won 5–0 against FC Viktoria Plzeň.

Loan to Cagliari
On 31 January 2019, Pellegrini joined Cagliari on loan until 30 June 2019.

Juventus
On 30 June 2019, Luca Pellegrini joined Serie A champions Juventus for €22 million, with Leonardo Spinazzola moving in the opposite direction for €29.5 million. On 19 August 2019, he rejoined Cagliari on loan for the 2019–20 season. On 26 September 2020, Pellegrini moved to Genoa on a one-year loan. He moved to Eintracht Frankfurt in the Bundesliga on a one-year loan on 12 August 2022. On 31 January 2023, Pellegrini was recalled from the Eintract loan and loaned to Lazio instead, with an option to buy.

International career
Pellegrini made his debut with the Italy U21 team on 11 October 2018, in a friendly match lost 1–0 against Belgium.

With the Italy U20 side he took part in the 2019 FIFA U-20 World Cup, in which Italy achieved a fourth–place finish.

He received his first call up to the Italy senior squad for the team's UEFA Euro 2020 qualifying matches against Armenia and Finland in September 2019.

He made his senior debut with Italy on 11 November 2020, featuring as a substitute in a 4–0 friendly win over Estonia in Florence.

Despite appearing in earlier qualifiers, he was not selected for Italy's 2021 UEFA European Under-21 Championship squad. He was unavailable for selection as he was suffering from a persistent adductor muscle injury beginning in February 2021.

Style of play
Although he usually plays as a left-back, Pellegrini has also been used as an offensive-minded central midfielder, known as the "mezzala" role, in Italian. A physically powerful and technically gifted defender, he is also known for his quality, stamina, consistency, and work-rate. Regarded in the media as a promising young player, in July 2019 he was included in UEFA.com's "50 for the future" list of "ones to watch in 2019–20."

Career statistics

Club

International

Honours
Italy U20
 FIFA U-20 World Cup fourth place: 2019

References

External links

 
 
 

1999 births
Living people
Footballers from Rome
Italian footballers
Association football fullbacks
A.S. Roma players
Cagliari Calcio players
Juventus F.C. players
Genoa C.F.C. players
Eintracht Frankfurt players
S.S. Lazio players
Serie A players
Bundesliga players
Italy youth international footballers
Italy under-21 international footballers
Italy international footballers
Italian expatriate footballers
Expatriate footballers in Germany
Italian expatriate sportspeople in Germany